"Milk and Toast and Honey" is a song by Swedish pop music duo Roxette, released on 10 September 2001 as the third and final single from their seventh studio album, Room Service (2001). It was the only single from the album to be released in the United Kingdom, where it peaked at number 89. The song performed better elsewhere, becoming the album's highest-charting single in Portugal, and Roxette's longest-charting single in several years in both Sweden and Switzerland.

Composition and style
The song was written by Per Gessle, who said he had the melody stuck in his head for six months before writing it down and recording a demo in his Tits & Ass recording studio in Halmstad. The liner notes of the duo's 2002 compilation The Ballad Hits describe vocalist Marie Fredriksson as believing the song would be "a piece of cake to sing, but [she] had to work harder than on any other Roxette track to find 'the magic moment'."

This is at odds with Fredriksson's own recollection of recording the song; she later said that she appeared at the recording studio as infrequently as possible during the Room Service sessions, and that she instructed her taxi driver to wait outside the studio while she performed the vocals of "Milk and Toast and Honey". Fredriksson said that she had "lost all desire to continue Roxette", primarily as a result of tension created by co-producer Michael Ilbert during the recording of Roxette's 1999 studio album Have a Nice Day, explaining: "I ended up under [Ilbert's] thumb. He would only communicate with Per and [Roxette's regular producer] Clarence Öfwerman. He complained to everyone that my voice was weak, that I needed to re-record vocals, and that my songs weren't good enough. He criticised me until I started crying. I lost all my confidence, and no longer felt happy in Roxette."

According to Ultimate Guitar, "Milk and Toast and Honey" has a moderately fast tempo of 141 beats per minute. The verse is composed of two repetitions of C–Em–Am–C–F–C–G, with the pre-chorus consisting of two short bars of F–C–G. The first chorus is made up of two sequences of C–F–Am–G, with subsequent choruses and the outro modified up an octave to a repeating pattern of D–G–Bm–A.

Commercial performance
The single was only released commercially in Europe and Australia, and was the only single from Room Service to be released in the United Kingdom, albeit peaking at just number 89 there. It performed moderately well on several European record charts, peaking at number 21 and spending 14 weeks on the Sverigetopplistan chart to become their longest-charting single in their home country since "You Don't Understand Me" in 1995. It performed even better on the Swiss Hitparade: peaking at number 29 and spending 17 weeks on the chart, making it their longest-charting single in that country since "Sleeping in My Car" in 1994.

It became the parent album's biggest hit in various Spanish and Portuguese-speaking territories. It peaked at number five on the Portuguese Singles Chart, and also performed well in neighbouring Spain—reaching number 18 on their airplay chart and number 29 on their national sales chart.

Formats and track listings
All songs written by Per Gessle.

 CD Single (Australia · Europe 8797140)
 "Milk and Toast and Honey" – 4:03
 "Milk and Toast and Honey"  – 3:49
 "Milk and Toast and Honey"  – 4:18
 "Milk and Toast and Honey"  – 4:20
 "Real Sugar"  – 3:27

 UK CD Single (CDEM-604)
 "Milk and Toast and Honey"  – 4:03
 "Milk and Toast and Honey"  – 3:49
 "Milk and Toast and Honey"  – 4:18
 "Milk and Toast and Honey"  – 4:03

 UK Promo 12" (12EMDJ-604)
 "Milk and Toast and Honey"  – 6:11
 "Milk and Toast and Honey"  – 3:48
 "Milk and Toast and Honey"  – 4:18
 "Milk and Toast and Honey"  – 3:49

Personnel
Credits adapted from the liner notes of The Ballad Hits.

 Recorded at Atlantis and Polar Studios, Stockholm in January and April 2000.
 Mixed by Ronny Lahti, Clarence Öfwerman and Per Gessle at Polar Studios, Stockholm.

Musicians
 Marie Fredriksson – lead and background vocals and production
 Per Gessle – background vocals, 12-stringed acoustic guitar and production
 Jonas Isacsson – electric guitar
 Christer Jansson – drums and cymbals
 Ronny Lahti – engineering
 Christoffer Lundquist – backing vocals
 Clarence Öfwerman – keyboards, programming and production
 Mats "MP" Persson – electric guitar
 Shooting Star – programming
 Strings by Stockholm Session Strings; Conducted by Mats Holmquist

Charts

Weekly charts

Year-end charts

References

2001 singles
2001 songs
Pop ballads
Roxette songs
Songs written by Per Gessle